Saurauia bracteosa is a species of plant in the Actinidiaceae family. It is found in Java and Bali in Indonesia.

References

bracteosa
Flora of Java
Flora of Bali
Vulnerable plants
Taxonomy articles created by Polbot